Wantmuri is a village in Hukeri taluk of Belgaum district in the southern state of Karnataka, India.

References

Villages in Belagavi district